Nasir Mahalleh (also Romanized as Naşīr Maḩalleh; also known as Nasir-Magala) is a village in Ahmadsargurab Rural District, Ahmadsargurab District, Shaft County, Gilan Province, Iran. At the 2006 census, its population was 3,090, in 802 families.

References 

Populated places in Shaft County